Solace Remixed is the first remix album by Australian alternative dance group, Rüfüs Du Sol. The collection features a sonically diverse reworking of the tracks from Rüfüs Du Sol's third studio album, Solace. Solace Remixed was released on 6 September 2019.

When asked what inspired the album, the band said "We've always loved people being able to put their own spin on our music in a new context. It felt like at this point we were able to get in touch with some of the artists we admire and it seemed like an opportunity not to be missed. It allowed some more dance-orientated artists to create special moments for dance floors around the world."

Track listing

Charts

Release history

References

2019 albums
Rüfüs Du Sol albums
Remix albums by Australian artists